The Rough Guide to the Music of Ethiopia refers to two albums by the World Music Network:

 The Rough Guide to the Music of Ethiopia (2004 album), focusing on music of the 1960s
 The Rough Guide to the Music of Ethiopia (2012 album), focusing on music of the 21st century